The 1977 Benson & Hedges Cup was the sixth edition of cricket's Benson & Hedges Cup. The competition was won by Gloucestershire County Cricket Club.

Fixtures and results

Group stage

Group A

Group B

Group C

Group D

Quarter-finals

Semi-finals

Final

See also
Benson & Hedges Cup						

Benson & Hedges Cup seasons
Benson